KBGZ (103.9 FM, "Big Country 103.9") is a radio station licensed to serve Spring Creek, Nevada. The station is owned by Global One Media LLC. and licensed to Richard Hudson. It airs a country music format.

Ownership and licensing
The station was assigned the KEBG call letters by the Federal Communications Commission on August 30, 2007. The station was licensed by the FCC on December 2, 2009. In April 2011, the call letters were changed to KBGZ concurrent with the station adding High Definition Radio Service. The HD2 program features '70's and 80's music, and the HD2 program is also rebroadcast on fill-in translator K299AN.

On November 26, 2007, Ken and Alene Sutherland applied to the FCC for a License to cover for KEBG.

References

External links
KBGZ official website

BGZ
Country radio stations in the United States
Elko County, Nevada
Radio stations established in 2008